The Fountain is a 1934 American romance film starring Ann Harding. It was directed by John Cromwell and distributed by RKO Pictures.

The film is preserved in the Library of Congress collection.

Plot

"A romantic drama concerning an exiled Englishwoman living in Holland during the First World War, who has to tell her wounded German husband that she has fallen in love with an interned British flyer (and childhood friend)."

Cast
 Ann Harding as Julie von Marwitz
 Brian Aherne as Lewis Alison
 Paul Lukas as Rupert von Marwitz
 Jean Hersholt as Baron Van Leyden
 Ralph Forbes as Ballaster
 Violet Kemble Cooper as Baroness Van Leyden
 Sara Haden as Susie
 Richard Abbott as Allard Van Leyden
 Barbara Barondess as Geof's wife
 Rudolph Anders as Geof Van Leyden
 Betty Alden as Allard's wife
 Ian Wolfe as Van Arkel
 Frank Reicher as Doctor
 Douglas Wood as de Greve
 Ferike Boros as Nurse

Footnotes

References
Canham, Kingsley. 1976. The Hollywood Professionals, Volume 5: King Vidor, John Cromwell, Mervyn LeRoy. The Tantivy Press, London.

External links
 
 

1934 films
1934 romantic drama films
American romantic drama films
American black-and-white films
Films scored by Max Steiner
Films based on British novels
Films set in the Netherlands
RKO Pictures films
American World War I films
Films with screenplays by Jane Murfin
Films directed by John Cromwell
1930s English-language films
1930s American films